Eucrada is a genus of death-watch and spider beetles in the family Ptinidae. There are at least two described species in Eucrada.

Species
These two species belong to the genus Eucrada:
 Eucrada humeralis (Melsheimer, 1846) i c g b
 Eucrada robusta Van Dyke, 1918 i c g
Data sources: i = ITIS, c = Catalogue of Life, g = GBIF, b = Bugguide.net

References

Further reading

 
 
 
 
 

Ptinidae
Bostrichiformia genera